Lartington Hall is a 17th-century country house, at Lartington, Teesdale, County Durham, England. It is a Grade II* listed building.

Architecture
The earliest part of the house, built for the Appleby family, is the three-storey four-bayed central block and projecting three-storey porch, which dates from about 1635. The west wing and chapel dedicated to St Lawrence were added in about 1800, and an east wing in the early 19th century, to which was added a ballroom in 1836 possibly to a design by Ignatius Bonomi. A curved porte-cochère on the north side, and adjoining vestibule and corridor, were added in 1861-5 by Joseph Hansom.

History
The Roman Catholic family of Maire acquired the manor of Lartington by marriage in 1654. It passed to the Lawson family when Sir Henry Lawson Bt (d. 1834)
of Brough Hall married Anna Anastasia, the Maire heiress. Their grandson Henry Thomas Maire Silvertop, who inherited the estate, married Eliza Witham and changed his surname to Witham. As Henry Witham he was High Sheriff of Durham in 1844.

When the Hall was Grade II* listed in 1986, the report added specifics, stating that in the 12th Century, the property had been owned by Robert de Lascelles. After several later sales, it was acquired in 1639 by "Francis Appleby and passed through marriage to the Maire family". The principal building "probably originated in the late C17, though there may have been an earlier building on the site".  The report also indicates that additions were made in the late 18th century "including a chapel, and of the early C19, including a ballroom (formerly museum) of c 1836".

Henry Witham's fourth son, the Right Reverend Monsignor Thomas Edward Witham, lived in the Hall from 1847 until his death. Witham had arranged to add a porte-cochere. In 1987, the property was inherited by his grandnephew Francis Silvertop of Minsteracres. This family sold it in 1910 and the new owner sold it again after WW I to a wealthy American, Norman Field. During WW II, the Hall was used by the Red Cross as a hospital for injured soldiers; Army tanks caused damage to the building and the grounds. Afterwards, the Field family again occupied it until 1973, and allowed it to deteriorate. The Hall then stood empty and neglected for some years, until it was purchased Robin Rackham. The most recent owners are Shona and John Harper-Wilkes.

A restoration project by Robin Rackham was completed with the assistance of the Historic Buildings Countil. It commenced in 1980, beginning with extensive works to the roof and moving on to the ballroom and corridor.

The more extensive "restoration, modernisation and redecoration" by the Harper-Wilkes ran from 2011 until 2015. In a 2013 interview, the couple said that the previous owners had "turned this chapel into a squash court" and the ballroom "into a recording studio for rock bands".

The property was listed for sale in late August 2022; at the time, the listing indicated that it had been used as a wedding and events venue until recently.

References

  English Heritage: Images of England, photograph and architestural description of listed building
    A Topographical Dictionary of  England  Samuel Lewis (1848) p 30-32 from British History Online: Lartington 
   A History of the County of York: North Riding Vol I (1914) p117-27 from British History Online: Lartington 

Grade II* listed buildings in County Durham
Country houses in County Durham
History of County Durham